The War Games is the seventh and final serial of the sixth season of the British science fiction television series Doctor Who, which originally aired in ten weekly parts from 19 April to 21 June 1969.

In the serial, an unnamed alien race led by the War Lord (Philip Madoc) kidnap and brainwash soldiers from wars throughout Earth's history to fight in war games on another planet as part of the aliens' plot to conquer the galaxy. The time traveller the Second Doctor (Patrick Troughton) and his travelling companions Jamie McCrimmon (Frazer Hines) and Zoe Heriot (Wendy Padbury) form a resistance army to stop this plot and to return the kidnapped soldiers home.

The War Games was the last regular appearance of Troughton as the Doctor and the last serial to be recorded in black and white. It also marks the last regular appearances of Padbury and Hines as companions Zoe and Jamie, and sees both the first naming and first appearance of the Doctor's race, the Time Lords.

Plot
On an alien planet, the Doctor uncovers a plot to conquer the Galaxy with brainwashed soldiers abducted from Earth and forced to fight in simulated "war games", reflecting the periods in history whence they were taken. The aliens' aim is to produce a super-army from the survivors; to this end, they have been aided by a renegade Time Lord, calling himself the War Chief.

Joining forces with rebel soldiers, who have broken their conditioning, the Doctor and his companions foil the plot and end the fighting. The War Chief is apparently killed when the leader of the aliens, the War Lord, realises he has been plotting against him. The Doctor admits he needs the help of the Time Lords to return the soldiers to their own timelines, but in asking, risks capture for his own past crimes, including the theft of his TARDIS. After sending the message he and his companions attempt to evade capture, but are caught.

Having returned the soldiers to Earth, the Time Lords place the War Lord on trial and dematerialise him. They erase Zoe and Jamie's memories of travelling with the Doctor, and return them to the respective point in time when each of them first entered the TARDIS. They then place the Doctor on trial for stealing a TARDIS and breaking the law of non-interference. The Doctor presents a spirited defence, citing his many battles against the evils of the universe. Accepting this defence, the Time Lords proclaim that his punishment is exile to Earth in the 20th century - a planet and period of which he is fond. The Doctor points out he is too well known on Earth, so the Time Lords tell him he will change his appearance, as he has before, and present him with images of four faces. He does not like any of them; impatient, the Time Lords inform him that a decision has been made for him. He cries out indignantly as the forced regeneration is triggered.

Production
As the TARDIS crew try to escape the Time Lords in Episode Ten, brief clips from The Web of Fear and Fury from the Deep are used to show the TARDIS in locations supposedly out of the Time Lords' reach. A model shot from Episode 1 of The Wheel in Space is used after Zoe is sent back to her own time and place by the Time Lords. Since this episode is missing, the shot sampled in The War Games is the only known surviving footage from this episode. Similarly, the shot of the TARDIS landing vertically on the sea is sampled from Fury from the Deep Episode 1, which is the only surviving footage from this episode.

Cast notes
Patrick Troughton's eldest son David made his second appearance in Doctor Who in Episode Six of this story as Private Moor, having first appeared in The Enemy of the World (1968). He subsequently appeared as King Peladon in The Curse of Peladon in 1972, and then as Professor Hobbes in "Midnight" in 2008.
Gregg Palmer previously played a Cyberman in The Tenth Planet in 1966.
Jane Sherwin who played Lady Jennifer Buckingham was producer Derrick Sherwin's wife.

Terence Bayler had previously played Yendom in The Ark (1966). Hubert Rees had previously appeared in Fury from the Deep (1968) and would return for The Seeds of Doom (1976). Edward Brayshaw had previously played Leon Colbert in The Reign of Terror (1964).  James Bree later played Nefred in Full Circle (1980) and the Keeper of the Matrix in The Ultimate Foe (1986). Leslie Schofield later played Calib in The Face of Evil (1977). Peter Craze had previously played Dako in The Space Museum (1965) and would appear again as Costa in Nightmare of Eden (1979). David Savile would later appear as Winser in The Claws of Axos (1971) and as Colonel Crichton in The Five Doctors (1983).

Philip Madoc had previously appeared as Eelek in The Krotons (1969), and the film Daleks – Invasion Earth: 2150 A.D. (1966) as Dalek collaborator, Brockley. He would go on to play Doctor Solon in The Brain of Morbius (1976) and Fenner in The Power of Kroll (1979). Bernard Horsfall (First Time Lord) had previously appeared as Lemuel Gulliver in The Mind Robber (1968), and would subsequently play Taron in Planet of the Daleks (1973) and Chancellor Goth in The Deadly Assassin (1976). In 2003 he appeared in Davros, a Doctor Who audio drama produced by Big Finish Productions. David Garfield later played Neeva in The Face of Evil (1977) and Professor Stream in the Sixth Doctor audio drama The Hollows of Time. Vernon Dobtcheff later played Shamur in the Fifth Doctor audio drama The Children of Seth.

Broadcast and reception

The BBC's Audience Research Report showed that The War Games was received positively, though not enthusiastically, by viewers.

Paul Cornell, Martin Day, and Keith Topping wrote of the serial in The Discontinuity Guide (1995), "It might be six episodes too long, but The War Games is pivotal in the history of Doctor Who. The introduction of the Time Lords ... sees the series lose some of its mystery, but gain a new focus." In The Television Companion (1998), David J. Howe and Stephen James Walker stated that the serial "gets off to a cracking start", though they noted that "A commonly expressed view is that, after this strong beginning, the story becomes dull and repetitive, picking up again only in the closing stages when the Time Lords are introduced." They praised the design work of the different war zones, the dialogue, and the conclusion. In 2009, Radio Times reviewer Patrick Mulkern was positive towards the detailed scripts and the various villains, especially the War Chief. The A.V. Club reviewer praised the way the serial subverted viewers' expectations of a typical historical story. He noted that there was padding to fill the running time, but felt that it was done well and that it worked better than in The Dalek Invasion of Earth. He also wrote positively of Madoc's War Lord and Jamie and Zoe's departure, and said that the story purposefully "doesn't resolve neatly or satisfyingly". Alasdair Wilkins of io9 praised Troughton's performance and the way that it was structured to "constantly [expand] the story's scope", though he admitted there was still padding. In a 2010 article, Charlie Jane Anders of the same site listed the cliffhanger to the ninth episode — in which the Doctor and his companions escape the base and try to get back to the TARDIS but their movements are slowed down as the Doctor tries to unlock and open the TARDIS doors — as one of the greatest Doctor Who cliffhangers ever.

A viewing of The War Games, and in particular the character of Jamie McCrimmon, inspired author Diana Gabaldon to set her Outlander series in Jacobite Scotland, and to name its protagonist "Jamie".

Commercial releases

In print

A novelisation of this serial, written by Malcolm Hulke, was published by Target Books in September 1979, entitled Doctor Who and The War Games.

In January 2011, an audiobook of the novelisation was released, read by David Troughton.

Home media

This serial was released in the UK in February 1990 in a two-tape set in episodic form. It was re-released in remastered format in September 2002. Since this VHS re-release, better quality film prints of the story were located at the BFI, and were used for the DVD release which occurred on 6 July 2009. This DVD release contained a number of bonus features, including the fan film Devious, which featured the last appearance of Jon Pertwee as the Third Doctor.

The "Regenerations" box set, released on 24 June 2013, includes The War Games but with no special features.

References

External links

Doctor Who Locations – The War Games
Doctor Who Restoration Team – The War Games

Target novelisation

1969 British television episodes
Cybermen television stories
Doctor Who pseudohistorical serials
Doctor Who serials novelised by Malcolm Hulke
Second Doctor serials
Television episodes about World War I
Doctor Who regeneration stories